William Millar "Bunk" Congalton (January 24, 1875 – August 19, 1937) was a Canadian right fielder in Major League Baseball. A native of Guelph, Ontario, he stood 5'11" and weighed 190 lbs.

Congalton was a minor league star who twice led the Western Association in batting average.  He reached the major leagues at the age of 27 with the Chicago Orphans, then was back in the big leagues three years later with the Cleveland Naps.  He was fourth in the American League in 1906 with a .320 batting average, and also ranked in the league's top ten for on-base percentage (.361), slugging percentage (.396), and home runs (3).  Playing for Cleveland and the Boston Americans in 1907, his .282 average was tenth-best in the league.

Congalton died at the age of 62 in Cleveland, Ohio after suffering a heart attack the previous Sunday at a Cleveland Indians game. He was interred at the Crown Hill Cemetery in Twinsburg, Ohio.

References

External links

1875 births
1937 deaths
Baseball outfielders
Baseball people from Ontario
Boston Americans players
Canadian expatriate baseball players in the United States
Colorado Springs Millionaires players
Columbus Senators players
Chicago Orphans players
Cleveland Naps players
Guelph Maple Leafs players
Hamilton Blackbirds players
Hamilton Hams players
Major League Baseball right fielders
Major League Baseball players from Canada
Marion Glass Blowers players
Milwaukee Brewers (minor league) players
Milwaukee Creams players
Minneapolis Millers (baseball) players
Omaha Rourkes players
Port Huron Marines players
Sportspeople from Guelph
Toledo Mud Hens players
Toronto Canucks players
Wheeling Stogies players